David Alan Huse (born May 16, 1958) is an American theoretical physicist, specializing in statistical physics and condensed matter physics.

Biography
After graduating from Lincoln-Sudbury Regional High School, Huse matriculated at the University of Massachusetts Amherst, where he graduated in 1979 with a B.S. in physics. He received in 1983 his Ph.D. from Cornell University with a thesis supervised by Michael E. Fisher. From 1983 to 1996, Huse worked in Bell Laboratories in Murray Hill. In 1996, he was appointed a professor in the physics department of Princeton University. At the Institute for Advanced Study, he has been appointed to positions for the autumn of 2010, and for the academic years 2015–2016, 2019–2020, and 2021–2022.

He was elected in 2010 a member of the American Academy of Arts and Sciences, in 2013 a fellow of the American Association for the Advancement of Science, and in 2017 a member of the National Academy of Sciences. In 2022 he received the Lars Onsager Prize with Boris Altshuler and Igor Aleiner for ""foundational work on many-body localization, its associated phase transition, and implications for thermalization and ergodicity."

In 1982 he married Julia Smith. They have two sons.

Selected publications
 
 
 
 
 
  Arxiv preprint
  Arxiv preprint

References

External links
 David A. Huse - Publications, Academic Tree
 
 
 
 
 
 
 
 
 
 
 
 

1958 births
Living people
20th-century American physicists
21st-century American physicists
Condensed matter physicists
Theoretical physicists
Scientists at Bell Labs
Fellows of the American Association for the Advancement of Science
Fellows of the American Academy of Arts and Sciences
Members of the United States National Academy of Sciences
Lincoln-Sudbury Regional High School alumni
University of Massachusetts Amherst alumni
Cornell University alumni
Princeton University faculty
Fellows of the American Physical Society